Sing Me Something New is the first solo album by Portuguese pop rock singer David Fonseca. It was released in Portugal in 2003. David Fonseca wrote all the songs and played most of the instruments in the album. The first single from his debut album was the mellow track "Someone That Cannot Love". The second and last single, the danceable anthem "The 80's" was chosen by Vodafone to their summer spot. The album reached gold status, by selling more than 30 000 copies.

Track listing

All songs by David Fonseca.

Intro  	
The 80's 	
Someone That Cannot Love 	
Playing Bowies With Me 	
So You Want To Save The World 	
U Make Me Believe 	
You and I (Letter to S.) 	
Haunted Home 	
Summer Will Bring You Over 	
Now That I Am You
Revolution Edit 	
In Love With Yourself 	
So You Really Believe That Love Will Keep You From Getting Hurt? 
Sing Me Something New 	
My Sunshine and My Rain

Singles
"Someone That Cannot Love" (2003)
"The 80's" (2003)

2003 albums
David Fonseca albums